Werner's worm lizard (Amphisbaena polygrammica) is a worm lizard species in the family Amphisbaenidae. It is endemic to Peru.

References

Amphisbaena (lizard)
Reptiles described in 1900
Taxa named by Franz Werner
Endemic fauna of Peru
Reptiles of Peru